The Western Freeway is a  freeway in western Brisbane that runs from Milton Road in Toowong to the western side of Indooroopilly where the freeway becomes the M5 Centenary Motorway. The freeway bears the symbol and forms part of Metroad 5. There is one interchange, at Indooroopilly onto Moggill Road. A bicycle path runs the length of the freeway, allowing commuting to Toowong and onto Brisbane by bicycle.

Options are currently being investigated in to a possible Kenmore Bypass. This would connect with the M5 along the existing preserved corridor to Chuwar, Queensland. This preserved corridor was identified in the 1960s for a future freeway.

History
The Western Freeway was constructed in two stages. The first stretched from Milton Road at Toowong south to Taringa Parade at Taringa, and was opened to traffic on 31 August 1970. Construction of the second stage (Taringa Parade to Moggill Road) commenced in 1975 and was opened on 24 May 1979. Later construction began on a direct link to the Centenary Highway, and this extension was opened to traffic on 19 December 1984.

Work began in 1985 on the duplication of the freeway as part of the larger Mount Cootha Road to Calmont Street project, which also involved the duplication of Centenary Bridge. The works were completed and commissioned by Russ Hinze on 27 March 1987.

In 2008–2009, the Toowong Bicycle and Pedestrian Overpass was constructed across the Toowong end of the freeway to connect the Western Freeway Cycleway (which runs parallel and east of the freeway) to Mt Coot-tha Road. The fifteen span composite bridge cost $5.4 million.

Work began in April 2011 on the Legacy Way, a tunnel to link the Toowong end of the Western Freeway with the Inner City Bypass at Kelvin Grove to reduce travel time between the Centenary Bridge and the Inner City Bypass by 70%.

In February 2014, work began on widening of Western Freeway (executed as part of Legacy Way tunnel project). The existing four lanes of freeway between western approach ramp of Legacy Way and Moggill Road interchange were upgraded to six lanes. The upgrade was intended to improve traffic flow on the freeway between Moggill Road and Legacy Way tunnel.

As a result of a citizens e-petition, on 9 October 2019, the overpass across the Western Freeway adjacent to the Toowong Cemetery (formerly known as the Toowong Bicycle and Pedestrian Overpass) was renamed the Canon Garland Overpass in honour of David Garland who pioneered Anzac Day ceremonies at the cemetery. The renaming occurred on the 80th anniversary of Garland's death.

Exits and interchanges
The entire freeway is in the City of Brisbane local government area.

References

See also

 Freeways in Australia
 Freeways in Brisbane

Roads in Brisbane
Highways in Queensland